The term chapel perilous first appeared in Sir Thomas Malory's Le Morte d'Arthur (1485) as the setting for an adventure in which sorceress Hellawes unsuccessfully attempts to seduce Sir Lancelot. T. S. Eliot used it symbolically in The Waste Land (1922). Dorothy Hewett took The Chapel Perilous as the title for her autobiographical play, in which she uses "the framework of the Arthurian legend, Sir Lancelot, to create a theatrical quest of romantic and epic proportions."

Other uses

As used in literature
The term as used in literature is explicated in detail by Jessie L. Weston in her 1920 book From Ritual to Romance. It is defined by Thomas C. Foster as "the dangerous enclosure that is known in the study of traditional quest romances." He cites the plot of the 1966 book Crying of Lot 49 as an example. This term is also used by Eleanore M. Jewett in her 1946 book The Hidden Treasure of Glaston.

As used in psychology
"Chapel perilous" is also a term referring to a psychological state in which an individual is uncertain whether some course of events was affected by a supernatural force, or was a product of their own imagination. It was used by writer and philosopher Robert Anton Wilson in his 1977 book Cosmic Trigger. According to Wilson, being in this state leads the subject to become either paranoid or an agnostic. In his opinion there is no third way.

The term "chapel perilous" was used by Antero Alli, in his 1986 book,  Angel Tech: A Modern Shaman's Guide to Reality Selection which is based on Timothy Leary's eight-circuit model of consciousness. In Alli's book chapel perilous is a rite of passage, when moving between the four lower circuits of consciousness to the higher circuits.

Cultural references
 "Exit Chapel Perilous" is a 2005 song by Umberloid, written and produced by Ott and Chris Barker.
 "Chapel Perilous" is a song by Telesma on their 2007 album O(H)M.
 Chapel Perilous is a 2013 comedy fantasy short film, directed by Matthew Lessner.
 "Chapel Perilous" is a song by Feed Me Jack, and was a part of their 2015 EP Anatolia.
 "Chapel Perilous" is a song by Mild High Club, which featured on their 2016 album Skiptracing, which heavily referenced the song "When You Wish Upon A Star" sung by Cliff Edwards
"Chapel Perilous" is a 2018 Album by the experimental rock band Gnod.

References

Arthurian literature
Mental states